Hard to Earn is the fourth studio album by American hip hop duo Gang Starr. It was released on March 8, 1994, by Chrysalis and EMI Records in North America. The album featured the singles "Mass Appeal", (their first charting single on the Billboard Hot 100 chart), "DWYCK" (featuring Nice & Smooth), and "Code of the Streets". Guest appearances on the album include Group Home, Jeru the Damaja, and Big Shug. At the time, all were part of the Gang Starr Foundation, which made the album a stepping-stone for future DJ Premier-helmed projects by Group Home and Jeru. Hard to Earn received acclaim and commercial success upon release.

The single "DWYCK" recorded in 1992 also featured hip hop duo Nice & Smooth. The track "Now You're Mine" originally appeared on the 1992 soundtrack White Men Can't Rap.

Hard to Earn is also the duo's first album to carry the "Parental Advisory" label.

Track listing

Charts

Weekly charts

Year-end charts

Singles chart positions

References

1994 albums
Gang Starr albums
Albums produced by DJ Premier
Albums produced by Guru
Chrysalis Records albums